North Raleigh Christian Academy (NRCA) is a private, coeducational, primary and secondary Christian day school located in Raleigh, North Carolina,  United States. Also referred to as simply North Raleigh or North Raleigh Christian, the school was founded in 1996.

History
North Raleigh Christian Academy was founded in May 1996 by Dr. Sonny L. Sherrill and a group of businessmen who wanted to start a Christian School in Raleigh, North Carolina.

The original site of the school was Mt. Vernon Baptist Church located in Raleigh, NC, which is now the current site of Neuse Christian Academy. In its first year, NRCA had 400 students in K–12th grade at its "Falls campus" at Mt. Vernon. In 1998, the school began a second campus with K-6th grade at Open Door Baptist Church where over 140 students arrived its first year. Open Door Baptist supported the "Durant campus" as it grew to over 250 students in three years. Total enrollment at both campuses reached 868 by 2001.

In 1999 the school purchased  on Perry Creek Road. The school's Board of Governors began plans for the "Perry Creek campus." Ground was broken in the fall of 2000 for the new campus.  The new campus was opened on August 19, 2002.

In 2009 NRCA purchased adjacent land and expanded the school, the project was completed by the start of the 2010–11 school year and has increased enrollment capacity to 1,800 students.

Academics and curriculum
North Raleigh Christian Academy is an accredited, state-approved, college-preparatory school. The school's accreditations include: SACS (Southern Association of Colleges and Schools), ACSI (Association of Christian Schools International), and CITA (Commission on International and Trans-Regional Accreditation).

The school offers dual-enrollment opportunities through The College at Southeastern, the undergraduate school of Southeastern Baptist Theological Seminary in Wake Forest, NC.

Notable alumni
Chesson Hadley, professional golfer on the PGA Tour
Phil Haynes, NFL offensive lineman (attended through Junior year)
Tyler Marenyi, better known by his stage name, Nghtmre, American DJ and electronic dance music producer

References

External links
 School website
 A Scene from the 2010 Production of 'Hello, Dolly!'

Christian schools in North Carolina
Private schools in Raleigh, North Carolina
Private high schools in North Carolina
Private middle schools in North Carolina
Private elementary schools in North Carolina
Nondenominational Christian schools in the United States
Educational institutions established in 1996
Preparatory schools in North Carolina
1996 establishments in North Carolina